Turkmenia may refer to:
Turkmenistan:
 Another name for the Turkmen Soviet Socialist Republic
 The present sovereign state of Turkmenistan
 2584 Turkmenia